Sally Ling, along with her husband Edward Nan Liu, opened the eponymous restaurant Sally Ling's in 1984 which is considered one of the first fine dining Chinese restaurants in the United States.  Her “culinary successes are well-known," according to her daughter's attorneys. The restaurant was at 256 Commercial Street in the Boston waterfront district from 1984 to 2003 (another location opened in Newton Center) and focused on white table clothed banquet fare. According to The Boston Globe, the original restaurant was "high-end and elegant". Regular diners included Martin Yan, Jasper White, Julia Child. and Yo-Yo Ma.  The restaurant relocated to Cambridge and New Jersey before closing, Since the restaurant has closed, Ling helps out her daughter Nadia Liu Spelman in Nadia's restaurant Dumpling Daughter.

Ling left the industry in 2010.

Legacy
Arguably, Jasper White’s most iconic dish was his pan roasted lobster and he has credited a chef who Worked nearby at Sally King’s with inspiring the dish.

References

American women restaurateurs
American restaurateurs
Year of birth missing (living people)
Living people
Restaurant founders